Karl-Heinz Reincke (28 May 1925 – 13 July 2011) was a German-born actor, long-based in Vienna.

Selected filmography

Films

A Heart Returns Home (1956) - Besselmann
Confessions of Felix Krull (1957) - Stanko
Tolle Nacht (1957) - Fotograf Alfred Erdmann
Der 10. Mai (1957) - Werner Kramer
Nasser Asphalt (1958) - Der Blinde
 (1958) - Hans Richter
Faust (1960) - Frosch
The Longest Day (1962) - Col. Josef 'Pips' Priller (uncredited)
Homesick for St. Pauli (1963) - (uncredited)
Waiting Room to the Beyond (1964) - Inspektor Dickes
 (1964) - Karl
Murderers Club of Brooklyn (1967) - Sam
When Night Falls on the Reeperbahn (1967) - Uwe Wagenknecht
The Doctor of St. Pauli (1968) - Willi Nippes
Commandos (1968) - Offizier Hans
The Bridge at Remagen (1969) - Councillor Holzgang
Heintje: A Heart Goes on a Journey (1969) - Alfred Teichmann
On the Reeperbahn at Half Past Midnight (1969) - Pit Pitter Pittjes
 (1970) - Klaus Helwig
The Priest of St. Pauli (1970) - Titus Kleinwiehe
 (1970) - Peter Fleming
Kelly's Heroes  (1970) - (uncredited)
My Father, the Ape and I (1971) - Konsul Hansen
Morgen fällt die Schule aus (1971) - Herr van Dongen
 (1971) - Oliver Kniehase
Jailbreak in Hamburg (1971) - Heinz Jensen
Rudi, Behave! (1971) - Kellner (uncredited)
The Reverend Turns a Blind Eye (1971) - Alfred
 (1972) - Traugott Jellinek
 (1972) - Max
My Daughter, Your Daughter (1972) - Schuldiener Oskar Sommer
Always Trouble with the Reverend (1972) - Alfred
Ein Käfer gibt Vollgas (1972) - Maggio
Crazy - Completely Mad (1973) - Major Karloff
Trip to Vienna (1973) - Hauptmann Sperlinger
The Bloody Vultures of Alaska (1973) - Capt'n Brandy
 (1973) - Bubi Berger
The Flying Classroom (1973) - Dr. Robert Uthofft, gen. Nichtraucher
 (1974) - Lockenfietje
The Secret Carrier (1975)
Everyone Dies Alone (1976) - Emil Borkhausen
The Mimosa Wants to Blossom Too (1976) - Obdachloser
Lady Dracula (1977) - Betrunkener (uncredited)
Hurra - Die Schwedinnen sind da (1978) - Heinz
Love Hotel in Tyrol (1978) - Prokurator
Die unendliche Geschichte (1984) - Fuchur (German version, voice, uncredited)
Nägel mit Köpfen (1986) - Museumsdirektor
Schlußabrechnung (1993) - Georg Halbe

TV movies/series
Adrian der Tulpendieb (1966) - Adrian
Derrick - Season 11, Episode 6: "Keine schöne Fahrt nach Rom" (1984) - Spediteur Henschel
Der Landarzt (1987–2010) - Albert Eckholm
Zwei Münchner in Hamburg (1989–1993) - Vadder Alfred Haack
Großstadtrevier - Altes Eisen (1991-2001) - Paul Lampe / Hans Menzel
Heimatgeschichten (1995-2004) - Konrad Prack / Rudi / Henry Köhler / Various Characters
Sylter Geschichten (1996) - Jens Jensen
Die Männer vom K3 (1996) - Heinrich Fitschen
Geschichten aus der Heimat - Affenliebe (1997)
Zwei Asse und ein König (2000) - Paulsen
Oben ohne (2007-2010) - Willi Horrowitz

External links

Personal Site 

1925 births
2011 deaths
German male television actors
German male film actors
20th-century German male actors
21st-century German male actors
Actors from Kiel
Male actors from Vienna